Daniel Duncan may refer to:
Daniel Duncan (physician) (1649–1735), Scottish-French doctor and chemist
Daniel Duncan (Ohio politician) (1806–1849), congressman from the US state of Ohio

Daniel Duncan McKenzie (1859–1927), parliamentarian and jurist from the Canadian province of Nova Scotia
Daniel Kablan Duncan (born 1943), foreign minister of Côte d'Ivoire
Dan Duncan (1933–2010), American co-founder, chairman and majority shareholder of Enterprise Products
Danny Duncan (musician) (born 1986), musician with We the Kings

See also